The first minister of Wales is the leader of the Welsh Government and keeper of the Welsh Seal. The first minister chairs the Welsh Cabinet and is primarily responsible for the formulation, development and presentation of Welsh Government policy. Additional functions of the first minister include promoting and representing Wales in an official capacity, at home and abroad, and responsibility for constitutional affairs, as they relate to devolution and the Welsh Government.

The first minister is a Member of the Senedd, and is nominated by the Senedd (Welsh Parliament)—before being officially appointed by the Monarch. Members of the Welsh Cabinet and junior ministers of the Welsh Government, as well as law officers, are appointed by the first minister. As head of the Welsh Government, the first minister is directly accountable to the Senedd for their actions and the actions of the Welsh Government. The main office of the first minister is in Tŷ Hywel which is adjacent to the Senedd building in Cardiff Bay. An additional office is also kept at the Crown Buildings, Cathays Park, Cardiff which is the headquarters of the Welsh Government.

Mark Drakeford of the Welsh Labour Party is the current first minister of Wales. He assumed office on 13 December 2018 as Wales' fourth First Minister, and the fourth first minister from the Labour Party, succeeding Carwyn Jones.

Terminology
Where initially established under the Government of Wales Act 1998, Section 53(1), the post was known as Assembly First Secretary, as Wales was given a less powerful assembly and executive than either Northern Ireland or Scotland. The choice of title was also attributed to the fact that the Welsh term for First Minister, Prif Weinidog, may also be translated as Prime Minister, so a different title was chosen to avoid confusion with the prime minister of the United Kingdom. The change of title occurred after the Liberal Democrats formed a coalition government with Labour in the National Assembly in October 2000. The Government of Wales Act 2006 allowed for the post to be officially known as "First Minister" and also made the first minister Keeper of the Welsh Seal.

On 22 October 2021, Mark Drakeford, the incumbent First Minister, changed his Twitter handle from @fmwales to @PrifWeinidog, in what has been described by some media as an effort to increase usage of the shortened Welsh language term for First Minister and Prime Minister. The post remains officially and commonly known as "First Minister" in English.

Nomination and appointment
Candidates for the position of First Minister are nominated by the members of the Senedd. The members elect the nominee for the first minister by majority vote. If no one is elected by a majority of votes cast with the first set of nominations, the process continues until a majority decide to cast their vote for one candidate. This process does not require an absolute majority of the Senedd (currently 31 out of 60 members)

Once this process has occurred the presiding officer shall formally send a letter to the reigning Monarch who must then appoint that nominee to the position of First Minister.

Role
Under the arrangements in the Government of Wales Act 1998, executive functions are conferred on the Senedd and then separately delegated to the first minister and to other Cabinet Ministers and staff as appropriate.

Until the Government of Wales Act 2006, these were delegated powers of the UK government. Since that Act came into force in May 2007, however, the first minister is appointed by the monarch and represents the Crown in Wales. Whilst this has little practical difference, it was a huge symbolic shift as for the first time the head of government in Wales is appointed by the Crown on the advice of the elected representatives of the Welsh people.

The first minister appoints the Welsh Ministers, Deputy Welsh Ministers and the Counsel General for Wales (collectively known as the Welsh Government), with the approval of The British sovereign.

Following separation between the legislative and the executive on the enactment of the Government of Wales Act 2006 (upon appointment of the first minister, 25 May 2007), the Welsh Ministers exercise functions in their own right.  Any further transfers of executive functions from the UK Government will be made directly to the Welsh Ministers (with their consent) by an Order in Council approved by Parliament.

The first minister is accountable and responsible for:
 Exercise of functions by the Cabinet of the Welsh Government
 Policy development and coordination of policy
 The relationships with the rest of the United Kingdom, Europe and Wales Abroad 
 Staffing/Civil Service.

See also
 List of current heads of government in the United Kingdom and dependencies
 Prime Minister of the United Kingdom
 Deputy First Minister for Wales
 Welsh Government

References

Sources
Dates are from World Statesmen and various BBC News Online articles from 1999 to 2003.

External links
 Roles and Responsibilities – 
 Welsh Government: Cabinet and ministers

Politics of Wales
Government of Wales
First Ministers of Wales
Welsh Government
1997 establishments in the United Kingdom